John Dickinson Dopf Mansion is a historic home located at Rock Port, Atchison County, Missouri. It was built in 1876, and is a two-story, Second Empire style brick dwelling.  It features a mansard roof ornamented with alternating bands of hexagonal and
square slate shingles and a one-story front porch.

It was listed on the National Register of Historic Places in 1984.

References

Houses on the National Register of Historic Places in Missouri
Second Empire architecture in Missouri
Houses completed in 1876
Buildings and structures in Atchison County, Missouri
National Register of Historic Places in Atchison County, Missouri